Inter Trans Avia was an airline based in Kyrgyzstan. In 2002 its fleet included an Antonov An-12B and an Antonov An-12BP aircraft.

References

Defunct airlines of Kyrgyzstan